Martine Desjardins may refer to:

Martine Desjardins (activist), Canadian activist and political candidate
Martine Desjardins (writer), Canadian writer
Martine Desjardins, French politician currently serving as mayor of Rudeau-Ladosse

See also
 Martin Desjardins, sculptor
 Martin Desjardins (ice hockey)